Budimir Đukić (also transliterated Djukić; born 26 July 1977) is a former Serbian footballer who played as a midfielder. His first club was FK Radnički Kragujevac, that in the beginning of the 2009–10 season, together with FK Šumadija 1903, formed a new club, FK Šumadija Radnički 1923.

References

External links
 
 
 
  

1977 births
Living people
Sportspeople from Kragujevac
Serbian footballers
Serbian expatriate footballers
FK Radnički 1923 players
FK Čukarički players
PFC Slavia Sofia players
PFC Spartak Varna players
Helsingin Jalkapalloklubi players
FK Metalac Gornji Milanovac players
First Professional Football League (Bulgaria) players
Veikkausliiga players
Expatriate footballers in Bulgaria
Expatriate footballers in Finland
Association football midfielders